Bruce Cox (c. 1918 - 2004) was an American photographer who worked for the Los Angeles Times from 1946 to 1980.

References

2004 deaths
People from Clovis, New Mexico
Woodbury University alumni
Photographers from California
20th-century American photographers
Los Angeles Times people
Year of birth uncertain